Shyam Sadhu, born Shamaldas Muldas Solanki, was a Gujarati poet from India.

Life 
Sadhu was born on 15 June 1941 at Junagadh, Gujarat, to Muldas Solanki. His grandmother Motibai was a bhajan singer who had published a few audio records. He completed his primary education in Junagadh. He studied ayurveda for two years, but dropped out due to family problems. Sadhu started writing poems in 1955 at the age of 15.  He eventually was associated with the local politics of Junagadh, but is most known for his poetry, which was first published 18 years after he started to write. Sadhu died on 16 December 2001.

Works 
Sadhu is considered to be one of the most important Gujarati ghazal poets. He experimented with new metres and used a conversational style in ghazal. Along with ghazals, he wrote free verse.

Yayavari, his first collection of poems, was published in 1973, followed by Thoda Bija Kavyo, Indradhanush (1987), Atmakathana Pana (1991; "Pages of Autobiography") and Sanj Dhali Gayi (2002). His complete poems were compiled and published by Sanju Vala as Ghar Same Sarovar in 2009.

Awards 
He received the Kavi Shekhadam Abuwala Award and the Babasaheb Ambedkar Award.

References

External links 
 

Gujarati-language writers
Indian male poets
Poets from Gujarat
Gujarati-language poets
20th-century Indian poets
1941 births
2001 deaths
20th-century Indian male writers